Laxmannia is a genus of tufted perennial herbs in the family Asparagaceae, subfamily Lomandroideae, that are endemic to Australia.

Species:

 Laxmannia arida Keighery - WA, NT
 Laxmannia brachyphylla F.Muell. – Stilted Paper-Lily - WA
 Laxmannia compacta Conran & P.I.Forst. - NSW, Qld
 Laxmannia gracilis R.Br. – Slender Wire-lily - NSW, Qld, Vic
 Laxmannia grandiflora Lindl. - WA
 Laxmannia jamesii Keighery – Paperlily  - WA
 Laxmannia minor R.Br.  - WA
Laxmannia morrisii Keighery - Tas
 Laxmannia omnifertilis Keighery - WA
 Laxmannia orientalis Keighery – Dwarf Wire-lily - SA, Vic, Tas
 Laxmannia paleacea F.Muell. - WA
 Laxmannia ramosa Lindl. – Branching Lily - WA
 Laxmannia sessiliflora Decne. - WA
 Laxmannia squarrosa Lindl. – Nodding Lily - WA

References

 
Asparagaceae genera
Asparagales of Australia
Endemic flora of Australia